Karl Franz Durspekt (23 November 1913 in Vienna, Austria – 14 February 1978 in Vienna, Austria) was an Austrian football player and manager.

As the son of an engine driver, Durspekt worked as a type setter at first. Later he became a professional football player. When he was a young man, he lived about five years in Rouen (France). He spoke fluently in a French and in a Swedish manner. Further, Sweden became his second home. At the beginning of his career, he played for Admira Wien. During this time he won repeatedly the Austrian championship and the Austrian cup.

Durspekt participated in the Mitropa Cup 1934, losing the final to Bologna FC (3:2, 1:5). After the Anschluss that united Germany and Austria in 1938 Admira played for several seasons in the Gauliga Ostmark, one of the top flight regional leagues created through the reorganization of German football under the Third Reich. Durspekt contested with his club Germany's national final in 1939, losing 0:9 to Schalke 04.

After his time at Admira, he played for Florisdorfer Athletic Club (FAC). During the Second World War, he joined LSV Markersdorf an der Pielach. The club was regarded as a centre d'accueil for draftee soccer players. There are also other well-known German and Austrian soccer players like Max Merkel or Karl Sesta.

After the War he returned to FAC and ended his career as a football player. He played two international matches for Austria in 1935 (0:0 vers. Czechoslovakia, 3:6 vers. Hungary). After he ended his career, he went on to become a coach. He trained teams in Egypt, Greece, Sweden, Norway and in Switzerland among others. The Lunds BK, FC Locarno (1953–54), Åtvidabergs FF (1956–1957), Grazer AK, IK Start Kristiansand (1970) were some of his stations as football coach.

He died at the age of 64 in 1978.

References

1913 births
1978 deaths
Footballers from Vienna
Austrian footballers
FC Rouen players
Ligue 1 players
Austrian football managers
Austria international footballers
Austrian expatriate footballers
Expatriate footballers in France
Floridsdorfer AC managers
Lunds BK managers
Åtvidabergs FF managers
Grazer AK managers
PAOK FC managers
IK Start managers
FC Locarno managers
Association football forwards
Expatriate football managers in Norway
Austrian expatriate sportspeople in Norway